Omar Samuel Pasley (born 3 September 1986), better known by his stage name OMI, is a Jamaican singer. He is best known for "Cheerleader", a worldwide hit for him in a remixed version by German DJ Felix Jaehn. He is currently signed to Ultra Music, a part of Sony Music, and released his debut album Me 4 U in 2015.

Career

Beginnings 
Omar Samuel Pasley was born in the parish of Clarendon. He established in Kingston, after being discovered by the dancehall impresario Clifton Dillon (known as Specialist) and signed to Oufah, an independent Jamaican label. His first recorded single was "Standing On All Threes" released with a music video. OMI had composed his future hit song "Cheerleader" in 2008. He eventually recorded it and performed and released in 2012. It was released in Jamaica along with a low-budget, high-concept video shot in Oregon during OMI's first trip to the United States, becoming a modest hit in Jamaica and also popular in Hawaii and in Dubai. Never releasing an album, OMI had various local hits in Jamaica like "Take It Easy", "Fireworks" (accompanied by a music video) and "Color of My Lips", the latter featuring Busy Signal, a well-known Jamaican dancehall, ska, and reggae artist.

2014–present: Me 4 U 
In 2014, "Cheerleader" got a second life when Patrick Moxey, the president of Ultra Music, a dance label partly owned by Sony Music heard the song and liked it offering to remix the song and relaunch it as a dance track. In early 2014, Ultra Music commissioned two remixes for the song, one by Ricky Blaze and the other by Felix Jaehn, a 20-year-old German producer. Eventually Ultra Music opted for the airy tropical house version of "Cheerleader" as remixed by Jaehn. The remix initially became a huge hit in Sweden, eventually certified 5 times platinum. Soon the song spread through other European charts, notably France, Italy and Germany. It topped the charts in several European countries and in Australia. In the United Kingdom, OMI made history on 24 May 2015, when "Cheerleader" topped the UK Singles Chart for a fourth week in a row, marking the longest consecutive period any Jamaican artist has held that position on the chart. In the United States, the song entered the Billboard Hot 100 in May 2015; it later made the top spot of the Hot 100 after 12 weeks in the chart. Claiming the top spot, OMI has achieved recognition worldwide. On 27 August 2015, he released the single "Hula Hoop". He released his debut studio album Me 4 U on 16 October 2015. The album includes the singles "Cheerleader", "Hula Hoop", "Stir It", and "Drop in the Ocean".

Discography

Studio album

Remix album

Singles

As lead artist 

Notes

As featured artist

Awards and nominations

See also 
List of artists who reached number one in the United States

References

External links 
Official website

1986 births
Living people
Jamaican male singers
Jamaican pop singers
People from Clarendon Parish, Jamaica
Tropical house musicians